Gordon Black (19 January 1885 – 6 December 1954) was an Australian cricketer. He played one first-class match for London County in 1903 and one match for New South Wales in 1903/04.

See also
 List of London County Cricket Club players
 List of New South Wales representative cricketers

References

External links
 

1885 births
1954 deaths
Australian cricketers
London County cricketers
New South Wales cricketers
Cricketers from Sydney